Roosna-Alliku Parish was a rural municipality of Estonia, in Järva County. It had a population of 1238 (as of 2007) and an area of 132 km².

Settlements
1 small borough: Roosna-Alliku.
12 villages: Allikjärve, Esna, Kaaruka, Kihme, Kirisaare, Kodasema, Koordi, Oeti, Tännapere, Valasti, Vedruka and Viisu.

References